Morshed Ali Khan Panni is a Bangladesh Nationalist Party politician and the former Member of Parliament from Tangail-8.

Early life and family
Morshed Ali Khan Panni was born into the Bengali Muslim family known as the Zamindars of Karatia. His father, Khurram Khan Panni, was a civil servant and landowner. His ancestors were Pashtuns belonging to the Panni tribe, and had migrated from Afghanistan to Bengal in the 16th century where they became culturally assimilated.

Panni's older brother is Wajid Ali Khan Panni (Bunting), the motawalli or supervisor of the zamindari estate. The two brothers had a dispute after Bunting Panni rented Rokeya Manzil of the estate to Lighthouse School, a school established by Islami Chhatra Shibir in 2000.

Career
Panni was elected to Parliament from Tangail-8 as a Bangladesh Nationalist Party candidate in 1979. He was elected to Parliament in 1988 from Tangail-8 as a Jatiya Party candidate.

References

Jatiya Party politicians
Bangladesh Nationalist Party politicians
Living people
2nd Jatiya Sangsad members
4th Jatiya Sangsad members
Year of birth missing (living people)
Karatia Zamindari family
21st-century Bengalis
20th-century Bengalis